Sitt Nyein Aye (born 24 April 1956) is a Burmese artist.

Sitt Nyein Aye came from a small village, near Nyaung-U Township in Upper Myanmar. He was born Sein Aye to Daw Than Swe and U Tun Pe. His parents were farmers with no money for education. Monks in the village monastery provided the resources needed for him to attend high school. He secretly studied modern art but this was frowned on by his teachers, being dubbed "mad art". He failed to achieve the top prize that would have allowed him to study abroad. Instead he lived on the streets and sold artworks to passers-by.

Sitt Nyein Aye spent two months in custody for sketching the ruins of a student union that had been blown up by Ne Win in 1962. As a supporter of the pro-democracy movement in Burma, he has lived in exile in India.

He changed his name to Sitt Nyein Aye, which means War and Peace, after reading the novel by Leo Tolstoy, in his twenties.

Htein Lin, the Burmese painter and performance artist, studied under Sitt Nyein Aye.

See also 
 Burmese contemporary art

References 

Living people
Burmese activists
Burmese expatriates in India
1956 births
People from Mandalay Region
20th-century Burmese painters
21st-century painters